Meshkinshahr Geothermal Power Plant is a geothermal electricity generation station situated near Meshkinshahr, Iran. The plant which has an electricity generation capacity of 5 MW has been under construction since 2001 and came online in 2010, becoming Iran's first geothermal power plant. The water is heated up, deep in the ground where temperature is above . The heated up water upon de-pressurization at the surface turns to steam which is then used to power steam turbines for electricity generation. The plant is being further expanded to provide geothermal heating to areas in Ardabil Province for both domestic as well as industrial purposes. As power plant is situated in touristic Sabalan area, it is also hoped the nonpolluting nature of the plant will help to preserve the nature and attract more tourism to the area. In long term, Iran plans to use the gained experience with this power plant in installation of up to 12 other geothermal stations in the country.

See also

List of power stations in Iran
International rankings of Iran

References

Geothermal power stations in Iran